Raymond Matthew Fuoss (September 28, 1905 – December 1, 1987) was an American chemist who researched mainly on electrolytes, polyelectrolytes, and polymers. He held Sterling Professor status at Yale University.

Early life and education
Fuoss was born to Jacob Z. Fuoss in 1905 and graduated from Altoona High School.

After graduating summa cum laude from Harvard University, Fuoss accepted a Sheldon Fellowship to study at the University of Munich. He began his graduate studies at Brown University in 1930, after various teaching positions.

Career
From 1932 – 1933, Fuoss was a research instructor at Brown University, before being promoted to assistant professor for research from 1933 until 1936. While at Brown, Fuoss was the recipient of the ACS Award in Pure Chemistry. The award came with a monetary prize of $1000 for his achievement of producing the "first comprehensive theory of electrolytic solutions." Due to limited financial resources for university research during the Great Depression in the mid-1930s, Fuoss was contacted by the General Electric Research Laboratory, where he worked until the end of the Second World War. In 1945 he went to Yale University, where he was appointed a Sterling Professor Chair of Chemistry. In 1951, Fuoss was elected to the National Academy of Sciences and later, in 1954, was elected chairman of the American Chemical society's division of Polymer Chemistry.

Fuoss eventually retired from Yale University in 1974 but continued active research in electrolytes.

References

External links
Raymond M. Fuoss Papers (MS 1560). Manuscripts and Archives, Yale University Library.

1905 births
1987 deaths
Harvard University alumni
Brown University alumni
Yale University faculty
Yale Sterling Professors
Academics from Pennsylvania
20th-century American chemists
Members of the United States National Academy of Sciences